The Mount Popa pipistrelle (Pipistrellus paterculus) is a species of vesper bat. It is found in China, India, Myanmar, Thailand, and Vietnam.

References

Pipistrellus
Taxa named by Oldfield Thomas
Mammals described in 1915
Bats of Asia
Bats of Southeast Asia
Mammals of China
Mammals of India
Mammals of Vietnam
Taxonomy articles created by Polbot